Inevitable is the debut extended play by R&B singer Trey Songz. It was released on November 28, 2011, his 27th birthday. It features five songs that were originally supposed to appear on his studio album, Chapter V, but didn't make the final cut. It has two promotional singles, "Top of the World" and "What I Be On" which features rapper and longtime collaborator Fabolous, but the only official single on Inevitable is "Sex Ain't Better Than Love". The album cover has a white background version of his debut, I Gotta Make It, the only difference being he has a low cut instead of his at the time signature cornrows.

Release and promotion
The project was preceded by the hometown inspired promotional single, "Top of the World", already contained in Songz's previous project Anticipation II. The EP was released on November 28, 2011, with first week sales of 27,000 landing it at number 23 on the Billboard 200 and number four on the Billboard Top Hip-Hop R&B Albums chart. As of October 18, 2012 the EP has sold 91,000 copies in the United States.

Track listing

Charts

Weekly charts

Year-end charts

References

2011 debut EPs
Trey Songz albums
Atlantic Records EPs
Albums produced by Eric Hudson